John T. Flack (November 4, 1928 – August 19, 2016) was an American politician who served in the New York State Assembly from 1969 to 1982.

He died on August 19, 2016, in Roswell, Georgia at age 87.

References

1928 births
2016 deaths
Republican Party members of the New York State Assembly